A wolf collar (also known as  or) is a type of dog collar designed to protect livestock guardian dogs from attack by wolves. Wolf collars are fitted with elongated spikes to stop wolves from attacking dogs on the neck. Such collars are used by shepherds in many countries including Italy, Spain and Turkey.

Ancient Greeks used such collars to protect their dogs from wolf attacks.

In Latin the collar was called mellum or maelium or mellum or millus.

Use
A wolf collar is normally made out of metals such as steel. The length of the spikes can be quite long, but styles differ in different places. The dogs that normally wore the collars were ones used to protect livestock from attack by wolves. The purpose of the collar is to protect the dog wearing it when it has to fight the wolves. The collar base protects the dog's throat and carotid arteries, while the spikes are intended to deter bites to the neck or even injure wolves trying to do so. There are some tales that suggest that dogs were only given them after they had killed their first wolf; however, these are normally considered to be inaccurate.

References

Sources
 Brenda M. Negri, Spiked Collars Give LGDs an Edge, Farm Show Magazine Brenda M. Negri, Spiked Collars Give LGDs an Edge
 Goat Rancher Magazine article on Spiked Protective Collars by Brenda M. Negri

Dog equipment
Animal armour